Ross Mitchell Brown Jr (born January 12, 1955) is an American radio news anchor and voice-over artist. Mitchell is known most widely as the former announcer on the nationally syndicated Coast to Coast AM radio show with Art Bell and George Noory and The Savage Nation with Michael Savage. Mitchell is currently the radio announcer for Red Eye Radio and Eye on Washington on KKOH.

Mitchell began working in radio at age 13. He graduated from the University of the Pacific with a Bachelor of Arts degree in Communications. Mitchell was a disc jockey, news director and reporter in California. In 1983, he moved to Reno, Nevada and joined what was then KOH.

He  co-hosts Ross and Ryan in the Morning on weekday mornings from 5 a.m. to 9 a.m. along with Ryan Nutter. Mitchell was also the voice of XM Talk on XM channel 168 from 2009 to 2013.

Phil Hendrie has parodied Art Bell for many years on his own radio talk show, and impersonations of Mitchell's program introductions have always been an important element. Usually, these are focused on variants of "East of the Rockies, call...", twisted around to "If you're calling from Hell, or from Haiti, call 666-666..." and similar.

ZZ Top has also spotlighted Mitchell, featuring a clip of his introduction of the band on the album XXX.

On April 10, 2012, George Noory on Coast to Coast AM announced that Ross Mitchell's employer no longer wanted Mitchell to do the announcements for the show because the station no longer was an affiliate. According to the show's Facebook page, two other announcers — Charles Tomas and Dick Ervasti — were hired as replacements and announced that day.  This ended up being just a change in location, not absence, however, as Mitchell was immediately hired by Cumulus Media Networks' Red Eye Radio as that show’s voiceover announcer.

On September 16, 2013, Mitchell reunited with Coast to Coast founder and original host Art Bell as announcer for Bell's new Sirius XM Radio show, Art Bell's Dark Matter.

References

External links
www.kkoh.com KOH-AM 780 News Talk website

1955 births
Living people
American radio news anchors
Coast to Coast AM
Radio personalities from Nevada
People from Fresno, California
People from Reno, Nevada
University of the Pacific (United States) alumni